Ludowici Well Pavilion is a historic site in Ludowici, Georgia, located on McQueen Street. It was constructed in 1907 and supplied drinking water. It is in an open public area in the center of town.  It is shaped like an octagon and has wooden benches inside, which were originally outside.  It uses locally made tiles on the roof.  With renovations in 1958 and 1983, surrounding pine trees were removed, as well as a paneled ceiling and brick floor.  A steel post was added to the center for support.  

The site was significant as a public artesian well and for its social and humanitarian functions.  The functions as a well were so important to the community that the Neill McQueen family donated it as a public park.  It was a gathering place for political rallies, celebrations, and other public events.  It was added to the National Register of Historic Places on September 7, 1984.

See also
National Register of Historic Places listings in Long County, Georgia

References

Buildings and structures in Long County, Georgia
Infrastructure completed in 1907
Event venues on the National Register of Historic Places in Georgia (U.S. state)